The Los Cabos Open is a professional men's tennis tournament played on outdoor hard courts. It is part of the ATP Tour 250 series of the Association of Tennis Professionals (ATP) Tour. It is held annually in August in Los Cabos, Baja California Sur, Mexico.

Past finals

Singles

Doubles

Notes

References

External links
 Official website

 
ATP Tour 250
Hard court tennis tournaments
Tennis tournaments in Mexico
Baja California Sur
2016 establishments in Mexico